New Zealand competed at the 2019 Pacific Games in Apia, Samoa from 7 to 20 July 2019. A team of 55 athletes was selected to represent the country for New Zealand's second appearance at the Pacific Games. New Zealand competed in five sports.

Archery
 

New Zealand qualified 6 archers for the games.

Men
 Bradley Foster
 Adam Kaluzny
 Caleb Russ

Women
 Sarah Fuller
 Olivia Hodgson
 Suzanne Sundheim

Athletics

Men
 James Guthrie-Croft
 Brayden Grant

Women
 Sarah Langsbury
 Alana Ryan
 Emma Wilson

Football
 

The New Zealand U-23 team played in the men's tournament at the 2019 games.

Men's squad
TBC

Taekwondo
 

 Cole Krech-Watene
 Victoria Arsapin
 Alex Ryder
 Max Watene
 Finn Olsen-Hennessy
 Stella Bismark
 Nipesh Prakash
 Taylor Shaw

Weightlifting
 

 Kanah Andrews-Nahu
 Andy Barakauskas
 Laurel Hubbard
 David Liti
 Cameron McTaggart
 Bailey Rogers
 Megan Signal
 Haley Whiting

References

2019 in New Zealand sport
Nations at the 2019 Pacific Games
New Zealand at the Pacific Games